Protospinax is an extinct genus of cartilaginous fish from the Early Jurassic to Early Cretaceous of Europe and Russia. The type species, P. annectans, was found in the Solnhofen limestones of southern Bavaria. Formerly known from only two specimens, further museum specimens of P. annectans were discovered at the Museum of Comparative Zoology of Harvard University in the 1990s, having been misidentified as Squatina and Heterodontus. Five more species, all known only from isolated teeth, are also assigned to Protospinax.

Protospinax is a difficult taxon to accommodate in taxonomies. A recent study found it to be a squalomorph shark; one analysis placed it closest to angelsharks and sawsharks, but the authors concluded that its exact position within Squalomorphii is ultimately tentative due to a lack of unambiguous supporting traits.

References

Elasmobranchii
Early Jurassic fish
Late Jurassic fish
Early Cretaceous fish
Solnhofen fauna
Taxa named by Arthur Smith Woodward